A Cafe in Cairo is a 1924 American silent drama film directed by Chester Withey and starring Priscilla Dean, Robert Ellis and Carl Stockdale. Hunt Stromberg produced it for release by the recently established Producers Distributing Corporation. It was part of a wave of films with Middle Eastern settings which followed on from the success of Paramount's The Sheik in 1921.

Synopsis
When her British parents are killed when an Arabian desert bandit launches an attack on their encampment, their young daughter is spared and brought up as an Arab known as Nadia. The bandit who killed Nadia's parents wishes to marry her. She is ordered to steal some documents from a British secret service agent but falls in love with him, and refuses to help the bandit. He threatens to throw both her and her lover into the Nile, before he is killed. Nadia and her lover return to England.

Cast

Preservation
Witn no prints of A Cafe in Cairo located in any film archives, it is a lost film.

References

External links

Lobby card at Getty Images

1924 films
American silent feature films
Films directed by Chester Withey
1924 drama films
Silent American drama films
American black-and-white films
Producers Distributing Corporation films
Films set in Cairo
1920s American films